IFK Björkö is a Swedish football club located in Bohus-Björkö.

Background
IFK Björkö currently plays in Division 4 Göteborg B which is the sixth tier of Swedish football. They play their home matches at Björkövallen in Bohus-Björkö.

The club is affiliated to Göteborgs Fotbollförbund.

Season to season

Footnotes

External links
 IFK Björkö Official website
 IFK Björkö on Facebook

Football clubs in Gothenburg
Association football clubs established in 1925
1925 establishments in Sweden
Idrottsföreningen Kamraterna
Football clubs in Västra Götaland County